An American Citizen is a 1914 American silent romantic comedy film directed by J. Searle Dawley. The film is noteworthy as the feature film debut of John Barrymore. Distributed by Famous Players Film Company, the film is based on the 1897 Broadway play of the same name by Madeleine Lucette Ryley. The film is now presumed lost.

Cast
 John Barrymore - Beresford Kruger
 Evelyn Moore - Beatrice Carewe
 Peter Lang - Peter Barbury
 Hal Clarendon - Egerton Brown
 Mrs. M.S. Smith - Carola Chapin
 Ethel West - Georgia Chapin
 Howard Missimer - Sir Humphrey Bunn
 Edith Henkle - Lady Bunn
 Alexander Gaden - Otto Storbie
 Wellington A. Playter - Valet
 Joe Short - Office Boy
 Ernest Truex - Mercury
 Alexandru Haidau

See also
List of Paramount Pictures films
John Barrymore filmography

References

External links

 
 
 
 Famous Players - ad(archived)
 glass slide(archived)
An American Citizen: An Original Comedy in Four Acts by Madeleine Lucette Ryley

1914 films
1910s romantic comedy films
Films directed by J. Searle Dawley
American romantic comedy films
American silent feature films
American black-and-white films
American films based on plays
Lost American films
Lost romantic comedy films
1914 lost films
1914 comedy films
1910s American films
Silent romantic comedy films
Silent American comedy films
1910s English-language films